Wilhelm "Willy" Busch (4 January 1907 – 4 March 1982) was a German international footballer.

Club career 
He was a player of TuS Duisburg. From 1940 to 1943 he played with Toni Turek, the 1954 World Champion. And in the 1943–44 season he played in the final round of the German championship.

International career 
Busch won 13 cap for the Germany national football team, and took part in the 1934 FIFA World Cup.

External links

References

1907 births
1934 FIFA World Cup players
1982 deaths
German footballers
Germany international footballers
Association football defenders